The variable triplefin or striped triplefin, Forsterygion varium, is a triplefin native to New Zealand, but also introduced to Tasmania, Australia, most likely in shipments of oysters. It is found in rock pools and depths down to 30 metres, in reef areas of broken rock with kelp.

References

 
Tony Ayling & Geoffrey Cox, Collins Guide to the Sea Fishes of New Zealand,  (William Collins Publishers Ltd, Auckland, New Zealand 1982) 

Forsterygion
Endemic marine fish of New Zealand
Fish described in 1801
Taxa named by Johann Reinhold Forster